Doliodromia is a genus of flies in the family Empididae.

Species
D. avita Collin, 1928

References

Empidoidea genera
Empididae